Adenízia Aparecida Ferreira da Silva (born December 18, 1986) is a volleyball player from Brazil, who plays as a middle blocker for Pallavolo Scandicci.

Career
She started playing at 11 with the Clube Filadélfia. At the age of 13, she joined her current club Osasco.

She won the bronze medal and the "Best Blocker" at the 2005 Pan-American Cup, held in Santo Domingo, Dominican Republic.

She took the "Best Server" award and the gold medal with her team at the 2009 Final Four Cup held in Lima, Peru.

For the 2009/2010 she won with her team Sollys/Osasco the Brazilian Superliga and the 2010 South American Club Championship.

Adenizia won the bronze medal at the 2011 FIVB Women's Club World Championship playing in Doha, Qatar with Sollys/Nestle. She also was awarded  as the Best Blocker of the tournament.

Playing with Sollys Nestlé Osasco, Silva won the gold medal in the 2012 FIVB Club World Championship held in Doha, Qatar.  She was part of the Brazilian team which won the gold medal at the 2012 Summer Olympics.

Da Silva played with her national team, winning the bronze at the 2014 World Championship when her team defeated Italy 3–2 in the bronze medal match.

Da Silva won the Best Blocker award and the silver medal at the 2015 Pan American Games when her national team lost the championship match 0–3 to the United States.

Awards

Individuals
 2003 FIVB U18 World Championship – "Best Blocker"
 2004 U19 South American Championship – "Best Blocker"
 2005 FIVB U20 World Championship – "Best Blocker"
 2005 Pan-American Cup – "Best Blocker"
 2007–08 Brazilian Superliga – "Best Blocker" 
 2009 Final Four Cup – "Best Server"
 2010 South American Club Championship – "Most Valuable Player"
 2011 FIVB Club World Championship – "Best Blocker"
 2011–12 Brazilian Superliga – "Best Blocker" 
 2012 South American Club Championship – "Best Spiker"
 2014 South American Club Championship – "Best Middle Blocker"
 2015 Pan American Games – "Best Middle Blocker"

Clubs
 2007–2008 Brazilian Superliga –  Runner-up, with Finasa Osasco
 2008–2009 Brazilian Superliga –  Runner-up, with Finasa Osasco
 2009–2010 Brazilian Superliga –  Champion, with Sollys Osasco
 2010–2011 Brazilian Superliga –  Runner-up, with Sollys Osasco
 2011–2012 Brazilian Superliga –  Champion, with Sollys Osasco
 2012–2013 Brazilian Superliga –  Runner-up, with Sollys Osasco
 2014–2015 Brazilian Superliga –  Runner-up, with Molico Osasco
 2009 South American Club Championship –  Champion, with Sollys Osasco
 2010 South American Club Championship –  Champion, with Sollys Osasco
 2011 South American Club Championship –  Champion, with Sollys Osasco
 2012 South American Club Championship –  Champion, with Sollys Nestle
 2014 South American Club Championship –  Runner-up, with Molico Osasco
 2015 South American Club Championship –  Runner-up, with Molico Osasco
 2010 FIVB Club World Championship –  Runner-up, with Sollys Osasco
 2011 FIVB Club World Championship –  Bronze medal, with Sollys Osasco
 2012 FIVB Club World Championship -  Champion, with Sollys Osasco
 2014 FIVB Club World Championship -  Runner-up, with Molico Osasco

References

External links
 FIVB profile

1986 births
Living people
Brazilian women's volleyball players
Volleyball players at the 2012 Summer Olympics
Volleyball players at the 2016 Summer Olympics
Olympic volleyball players of Brazil
Olympic gold medalists for Brazil
Olympic medalists in volleyball
People from Osasco
Medalists at the 2012 Summer Olympics
Volleyball players at the 2015 Pan American Games
Pan American Games silver medalists for Brazil
Pan American Games medalists in volleyball
Middle blockers
Expatriate volleyball players in Italy
Brazilian expatriate sportspeople in Italy
Brazilian expatriates in Italy
Medalists at the 2015 Pan American Games
Sportspeople from São Paulo (state)